Julia Scarlett Elizabeth Louis-Dreyfus (born January 13, 1961) is an American actress, comedian, and producer who worked on the comedy television series Saturday Night Live (1982–1985), Seinfeld (1990–1998), The New Adventures of Old Christine (2006–2010), and Veep (2012–2019). She is one of the most award-winning actresses in American television history, having received more Primetime Emmy Awards and more Screen Actors Guild Awards than any other performer, tying Cloris Leachman (with eight) for the most acting awards.

Louis-Dreyfus broke into comedy as a performer in The Practical Theatre Company in Chicago, Illinois, which led to her casting in the sketch show Saturday Night Live from 1982 to 1985. Her breakthrough came in 1990 with a nine-season run playing Elaine Benes on Seinfeld, one of the most critically and commercially successful sitcoms of all time. Her other television roles include Christine Campbell in The New Adventures of Old Christine, which had a five-season run on CBS, and Selina Meyer in Veep, which ran for seven seasons on HBO. She has also made guest appearances on shows such as Arrested Development, Curb Your Enthusiasm, and 30 Rock. 

Her film roles include supporting turns in Hannah and Her Sisters (1986), National Lampoon's Christmas Vacation (1989), Deconstructing Harry (1997), and leading roles in Enough Said (2013), Downhill (2020), and You People (2023). She has also voice roles in the animated films A Bug's Life (1998), Planes (2013), and Onward (2020), and has played Valentina Allegra de Fontaine in the Marvel Cinematic Universe since 2021.

Louis-Dreyfus has received eleven Emmy Awards, eight for acting and three for producing, in addition to a Golden Globe Award, nine Screen Actors Guild Awards, and five American Comedy Awards. Louis-Dreyfus received a star on the Hollywood Walk of Fame in 2010 and was inducted into the Television Academy Hall of Fame in 2014. In 2016, Time named Louis-Dreyfus as one of the 100 most influential people in the world. In 2018, she received the Mark Twain Prize for American Humor, presented by the Kennedy Center as America's highest comedy honor.

Early life
Louis-Dreyfus was born in New York City on January 13, 1961. Her American-born mother, Judith (née LeFever), was a writer and special needs tutor, and her French-born father, Gérard Louis-Dreyfus, chaired the Louis Dreyfus Company. Her paternal grandfather, Pierre Louis-Dreyfus, was president of the Louis Dreyfus Group; he was a member of a Jewish family from Alsace and served as a cavalry officer and member of the French Resistance during World War II. She is also a great-great-granddaughter of Léopold Louis-Dreyfus, who in 1851 founded the Louis Dreyfus Group, a French commodities and shipping conglomerate, which members of her family still control; and is related to Alfred Dreyfus of the infamous Dreyfus affair.

In 1962, a year after Louis-Dreyfus' birth, her parents divorced. After moving to Washington, D.C., when Louis-Dreyfus was four, her mother married L. Thompson Bowles, dean of the George Washington University Medical School; Louis-Dreyfus gained a half-sister, Lauren Bowles, also an actress. Due to her stepfather's work with Project HOPE, Louis-Dreyfus spent her childhood in several states and countries, including Colombia, Sri Lanka, and Tunisia. She graduated from the all-girls Holton-Arms School in Bethesda, Maryland, in 1979. She later said, "There were things I did in school that, had there been boys in the classroom, I would have been less motivated to do. For instance, I was president of the honor society."

Louis-Dreyfus attended Northwestern University in Evanston, Illinois, where she was a member of the Delta Gamma sorority. She studied theatre and performed in the Mee-Ow Show, a student-run improv and sketch comedy revue, before dropping out during her junior year to take a job at Saturday Night Live. In 2007, she received an honorary doctor of arts degree from Northwestern University.

Career

1982–1988: Early career and Saturday Night Live

As part of her comedic training, Louis-Dreyfus appeared in The Second City, one of the best-known improvisational theatre groups. It was her performance with The Practical Theatre Company at their "Golden 50th Anniversary Jubilee" that led to her being asked to join the cast of NBC's Saturday Night Live at the age of 21.

Louis-Dreyfus subsequently became a cast member on Saturday Night Live from 1982 to 1985, the youngest female cast member in the history of the program at that time. During her time on SNL, she appeared alongside several actors who later rose to prominence, such as Eddie Murphy, Jim Belushi, Billy Crystal, and Martin Short. It was during her third and final year on SNL that she met writer Larry David during his only year on the show. David later co-created Seinfeld. Louis-Dreyfus has commented that her casting on SNL was a "Cinderella-getting-to-go-to-the-ball kind of experience"; however, she has also admitted that at times it was often quite tense, stating that she "didn't know how to navigate the waters of show business in general and specifically doing a live sketch-comedy show".

Recurring characters on Saturday Night Live
 April May June, a televangelist
 Becky, El Dorko's (Gary Kroeger) date
 Consuela, Chi Chi's friend and co-host of Let's Watch TV
 Darla in SNLs parody of The Little Rascals
 Weather Woman, a superhero who controls the weather
 Patti Lynn Hunnsucker, a teenage correspondent on Weekend Update

Following her 1985 departure from SNL, Louis-Dreyfus appeared in several films, including Woody Allen's Hannah and Her Sisters (1986), Soul Man (1986), and National Lampoon's Christmas Vacation (1989), in which she starred alongside fellow SNL alumnus Chevy Chase. In 1987, Louis-Dreyfus appeared in the NBC sitcom pilot The Art of Being Nick, an intended spin-off from Family Ties starring Scott Valentine. When the pilot did not make it to series, Louis-Dreyfus was retained by producer Gary David Goldberg for a role on his new sitcom Day by Day, as the sarcastic and materialistic neighbor, Eileen Swift. Premiering in early 1988, Day by Day aired for two seasons on NBC before being cancelled.

1989–1998: Seinfeld and widespread recognition

In the early 1990s, Louis-Dreyfus became famous for the role of Elaine Benes on NBC's Seinfeld. She played the role for nine seasons, appearing in all but three episodes. One of the episodes that she did not appear in was the pilot episode, "The Seinfeld Chronicles", because her character was not initially intended to be a part of the series. It was only after the first episode that NBC executives felt the show was too male-centric and demanded that creators Larry David and Jerry Seinfeld add a woman to the cast. It was revealed in the commentary on the DVD package that the addition of a female character was the condition for commissioning the show. Louis-Dreyfus won the role over several other actresses who also eventually enjoyed TV success, including Patricia Heaton and Megan Mullally.

On the "Notes About Nothing" featurette on the DVD package, Seinfeld says that Louis-Dreyfus's ability to eat a peanut M&M without breaking the peanut aptly describes the actress: "She cracks you up without breaking your nuts."

Louis-Dreyfus garnered critical acclaim for her performance on the series, and she was a regular winner and nominee at television award shows throughout the 1990s. Her performance earned her two Golden Globe Award nominations, winning once in 1994, nine Screen Actors Guild Award nominations, winning one in 1995 and two in both 1997 and 1998, and seven American Comedy Awards, winning five times in 1993, 1994, 1995, 1997 and 1998. In 1996, she won the Primetime Emmy Award for Outstanding Supporting Actress in a Comedy Series, an award she was nominated for on seven occasions from 1992 to 1998. After receiving the award, Louis-Dreyfus claimed the win was a "shocker", and that after being in both positions, it was "much better to win than to lose."

In 1998, Jerry Seinfeld decided to end the series after nine seasons. The series finale aired on May 14 and was one of the most-watched TV events in history, with over 76 million viewers tuning in.

During her time on Seinfeld, she appeared in several films, including Fathers' Day, opposite Robin Williams and Billy Crystal, and Woody Allen's Deconstructing Harry.

1999–2004: Post-Seinfeld
Following a voice role in the highly successful Pixar film A Bug's Life, Louis-Dreyfus lent her voice as Snake's girlfriend Gloria in The Simpsons episode "A Hunka Hunka Burns in Love". In 2001, she made several special guest appearances on Seinfeld co-creator Larry David's show Curb Your Enthusiasm, playing herself fictionally trying to break the "curse" by planning to star in a show in which she would play an actress affected by a Seinfeld-like curse.

After several years away from a regular TV job, Louis-Dreyfus began a new single-camera sitcom, Watching Ellie, which premiered on NBC in February 2002. The series was created by husband Brad Hall and co-starred Steve Carell and Louis-Dreyfus's half-sister Lauren Bowles. The initial premise of the show was to present viewers with a "slice of life" from the goings-on and happenings of the life of Ellie Riggs, a Southern California jazz singer. The first season included a 22-minute countdown kept digitally in the lower left-hand corner of the screen, which many critics panned, claiming it was useless and "did nothing for the show." Overall, the show received mixed reviews but debuted strongly with over 16 million viewers tuning in for the series premiere, and maintained an average audience of about 10 million viewers per week.

When the series returned for a second season in the spring of 2003, it suffered a decline in viewership, averaging around eight million viewers per week. The show had undergone a drastic stylistic change between the production of seasons one and two. The first season was filmed in the single-camera format, but the second season was presented as a traditional multicamera sitcom filmed in front of a live studio audience. With dwindling viewership and failing to retain the numbers from its Frasier lead-in, the series was cancelled by NBC in May 2003.

Following NBC's cancellation of Watching Ellie, the media began circulating rumors of a so-called "Seinfeld curse", which claimed that none of the former Seinfeld actors could ever achieve success again in the television industry. Louis-Dreyfus dismissed the rumor as "a made-up thing by the media", while Seinfeld co-creator Larry David asserted that the curse was "completely idiotic."

Louis-Dreyfus was interested in the role of Susan Mayer on Desperate Housewives, the role that ultimately went to Teri Hatcher. Instead, Louis-Dreyfus scored a recurring guest role as Maggie Lizer, the deceitful prosecutor and love interest of Michael Bluth on the Emmy-winning comedy Arrested Development, from 2004 to 2005.

2005–2010: The New Adventures of Old Christine

In 2005, Louis-Dreyfus was cast in the title role of a new CBS sitcom, The New Adventures of Old Christine. The series and its concept were created by writer and producer of Will & Grace, Kari Lizer. The series told the story of Christine Campbell, a single mother who manages to maintain a fantastic relationship with her ex-husband while running a women's gym. The series debuted on CBS in March 2006 to an audience of 15 million and was initially a ratings winner for the network.

Louis-Dreyfus also garnered considerable critical acclaim for her performance on the show, with Brian Lowry of Variety stating that Louis-Dreyfus broke the so-called "Seinfeld curse [...] with one of the best conventional half-hours to come along in a while." Alessandra Stanley from The New York Times asserted that Louis-Dreyfus's performance on the series proved she is "one of the funniest women on network television." Louis-Dreyfus additionally earned the 2006 Primetime Emmy Award for Outstanding Lead Actress in a Comedy Series for her performance in the first season. Referring to the curse, she stated in her acceptance speech, "I'm not somebody who really believes in curses, but curse this, baby!" Throughout the course of the series, she received five consecutive Emmy Award nominations, three consecutive Satellite Award nominations, two Screen Actors Guild Award nominations, and a nomination for a Golden Globe Award. In 2007, she also received two nominations for a People's Choice Award due to her return to popularity, thanks to the success of Old Christine.

In May 2006, Louis-Dreyfus hosted an episode of Saturday Night Live, becoming the first female former cast member to return to the show in the hosting role. In the episode, she appeared with her Seinfeld co-stars Jason Alexander and Jerry Seinfeld in her opening monologue, parodying the so-called "Seinfeld curse". After a successful reception from her 2006 episode, Louis-Dreyfus was invited again to host SNL on March 17, 2007, and again on April 17, 2016. Louis-Dreyfus reprised her role as Gloria in two Simpsons episodes: 2007's "I Don't Wanna Know Why the Caged Bird Sings" and 2008's "Sex, Pies and Idiot Scrapes". In the fall of 2009, she appeared with the rest of the cast of Seinfeld in four episodes of the seventh season of Larry David's sitcom Curb Your Enthusiasm. The reunion shows received much media attention, and the episode received strong ratings for the HBO series.

In 2009, Louis-Dreyfus was granted the honorary award for Legacy of Laughter at the TV Land Awards. Previous winners had included Lucille Ball and Mike Myers. She was presented with the award by friend Amy Poehler. The following year, Louis-Dreyfus received the 2,407th star on the Hollywood Walk of Fame on May 4, 2010, for her remarkable contribution to the broadcast television industry as both an actress and a comedian. Originally, the star was set with Louis-Dreyfus's name spelled incorrectly. It was missing both the 'o' and the hyphen in her last name. The star was corrected and the misspelled portion was removed and presented to the actress. Celebrity guests at the event included past and current colleagues from throughout her career, including Clark Gregg, Larry David, Eric McCormack, and Jason Alexander.

Old Christine was cancelled by CBS on May 18, 2010, after 5 years. After its disbandment from CBS, discussions were held with ABC for the show to be revived on the network, but these plans never came to fruition.

In the spring of 2010, Louis-Dreyfus guest-starred several times in the third season of the web series Web Therapy, starring Lisa Kudrow. Louis-Dreyfus played the sister of the main character Fiona Wallice, who gives her therapy online. When the series made the transition to cable television on the Showtime network, Louis-Dreyfus's appearance from the web series was included in the second season, airing in July 2012.

In fall 2010, Louis-Dreyfus made a guest appearance on the live episode of the Emmy-winning comedy 30 Rock. She played Tina Fey's role of Liz Lemon in the cutaway shots. Louis-Dreyfus was among several Saturday Night Live alumni appearing in the episode, including Rachel Dratch, Bill Hader, and regulars Tracy Morgan and Fey herself. Louis-Dreyfus also starred in a "Women of SNL" special on November 1, 2010, on NBC.

2011–2019: Veep
In May and June 2011, Louis-Dreyfus teamed up with husband Brad Hall for her first short film, Picture Paris. This was the first time the couple had collaborated since their early-2000s NBC comedy Watching Ellie. Hall wrote and directed the film, while Louis-Dreyfus played the lead role of an ordinary woman with an extraordinary obsession with the city of Paris. The film premiered on January 29, 2012, at the Santa Barbara International Film Festival, and has received considerable critical acclaim. It made its television premiere on HBO on December 17, 2012.

In early 2011, HBO confirmed that Louis-Dreyfus had been cast in the lead role of U.S. Vice President Selina Meyer in a new satirical comedy series titled Veep. The series was commissioned for a first season of eight episodes. It was announced, in addition to her starring role, Louis-Dreyfus would also serve as a producer of the series. In preparation for her role, Louis-Dreyfus spoke with two former vice presidents, including Al Gore, senators, speechwriters, chiefs of staffs of various offices, and schedulers. Louis-Dreyfus has commended HBO for allowing the cast and crew to engage in a "protracted pre-production process", which included a six-week rehearsal period before filming began.

The first season was filmed in the fall of 2011, in Baltimore, and the series premiered on April 22, 2012. The premiere episode was met with high praise from critics, particularly for Louis-Dreyfus's performance. The Hollywood Reporter asserted that the character of Selina Meyer was her "best post-Seinfeld role" to date and claimed that she gives "an Emmy-worthy effort", while the Los Angeles Times contended that the series demonstrates that she is "one of the medium's great comediennes." Following the success of the first season, Louis-Dreyfus was named by the Huffington Post as one of the funniest people of 2012, asserting that she is the "most magnetic and naturally funny woman on TV since Mary Tyler Moore."

For her performance on Veep, Louis-Dreyfus has received several accolades, most notably six consecutive Primetime Emmy Awards for Outstanding Lead Actress in a Comedy Series from 2012 to 2017. Her Emmy wins for Veep, following previous wins for Seinfeld and The New Adventures of Old Christine, resulted in her becoming the only woman to win an acting award for three separate comedy series. Her sixth win for Outstanding Lead Actress in a Comedy Series in 2016 surpassed the record previously held by Mary Tyler Moore and Candice Bergen for the most wins in that category. In 2017 her sixth consecutive win and eighth acting win overall made her the performer with the most Emmys for the same role in the same series (surpassing Candice Bergen and Don Knotts) and put her in a tie with Cloris Leachman for the most Emmys ever won by a performer. She was also nominated as one of the producers for Veep in the Primetime Emmy Award for Outstanding Comedy Series category from 2012 to 2014, but the show lost to Modern Family on all three occasions. The show, however, won the top award from 2015 to 2017.

Louis-Dreyfus has also received five Critics' Choice Television Award nominations, winning twice in 2013 and 2014, ten Screen Actors Guild Award nominations, winning twice in 2014 and 2017, and five Television Critics Association Award nominations, winning once in 2014. Her performance has additionally garnered her five Satellite Award nominations and five consecutive Golden Globe Award nominations.

Louis-Dreyfus lent her voice to the 2013 animated film Planes, in the role of Rochelle. To date, the film has grossed well over $200 million at the box office worldwide. She also starred in the film Enough Said, directed by Nicole Holofcener, which was released on September 18, 2013. This marked her debut as a lead actress in a full-length feature film. The film garnered rave reviews from film critics, ranking among the best-reviewed films of 2013. The website Rotten Tomatoes gives the film a score of 96% based on 152 reviews, many of them praising Louis-Dreyfus's performance. She received several Best Actress nominations for her role in the film at award ceremonies, including the Golden Globe Awards, Satellite Awards, Critics' Choice Movie Awards, and the American Comedy Awards.

Since December 2014, Louis-Dreyfus has appeared in a series of television commercials for Old Navy.

On April 16, 2016, she hosted Saturday Night Live for the third time with musical guest Nick Jonas. During the episode's cold open, she reprised her role of Elaine Benes from Seinfeld.

2020–present: Production deal with Apple TV+
In 2020, Louis-Dreyfus headlined the comedy-drama Downhill, opposite Will Ferrell. The film premiered at the 2020 Sundance Film Festival and was theatrically released on February 14. Next, she voiced a suburban elf mother in Pixar's Onward opposite Tom Holland and Chris Pratt. The film was released on March 6, 2020.

In January 2020, Louis-Dreyfus signed a multi-year deal with Apple TV+. Under the deal, she will develop new projects for Apple TV+ as both an executive producer and star.

In 2021, Louis-Dreyfus appeared in the Disney+ series The Falcon and the Winter Soldier as Valentina Allegra de Fontaine, which is set in the Marvel Cinematic Universe, though she was originally intended to debut in the film Black Widow (where she appears in the post credit scene). She reprised the role in Black Panther: Wakanda Forever (2022), and will also appear in the upcoming film Thunderbolts (2024).

Personal life

Louis-Dreyfus's maternal half-sister, Lauren Bowles, is also an actress. She also has two paternal half-sisters, Phoebe and Emma, the latter of whom died in August 2018. Robert Louis-Dreyfus, one of her cousins, was the former CEO of Adidas and owner of the Olympique de Marseille football club.

While at Northwestern, Louis-Dreyfus met future husband and Saturday Night Live comedian Brad Hall.  They married in 1987 and have two sons together. Her older son is a singer-songwriter who has performed on The Tonight Show. Her younger son Charlie Hall is a television actor. In 2007, Louis-Dreyfus was invited back to Northwestern to receive an honorary Doctor of Arts degree.

Louis-Dreyfus has stated that she holds much respect for "women who are not afraid of making themselves look bad or foolish to get a laugh", and cites her acting idols as Lucille Ball, Mary Tyler Moore, Madeline Kahn, Teri Garr, Valerie Harper, and Cloris Leachman. Actress Tina Fey said that Louis-Dreyfus served as inspiration for her character Liz Lemon on the award-winning NBC comedy series 30 Rock.

On September 28, 2017, Louis-Dreyfus announced on Twitter her diagnosis of breast cancer, a diagnosis she received one day after receiving a Primetime Emmy Award for Outstanding Lead Actress in a Comedy Series for her role in Veep. She stated, "One in eight women get breast cancer. Today, I'm the one. The good news is that I have the most glorious group of supportive and caring family and friends, and fantastic insurance through my union. The bad news is that not all women are so lucky, so let's fight all cancers and make universal healthcare a reality." She announced on the October 18, 2018, episode of Jimmy Kimmel Live! that she was cancer-free.

Politics
Louis-Dreyfus supported Al Gore's 2000 U.S. presidential bid, and also endorsed Barack Obama's bid for the presidency in 2008 and 2012. She appeared in a video that urged Obama to reject the proposal of the Keystone XL pipeline, arguing that if the pipeline ever were to leak, it would cause mass pollution across the U.S. Additionally, she has voiced her concern for several environmental issues and has raised millions for Heal the Bay, the Natural Resources Defense Council, and the Trust for Public Land. She also worked for the successful passage of Proposition O, which allocated US$500 million for cleaning up the Los Angeles water supply.

In late October 2010, before the United States Senate election in California, Louis-Dreyfus starred in a humorous Barbara Boxer ad regarding energy policy.

During the 2016 Democratic National Convention, Louis-Dreyfus announced her endorsement of Hillary Clinton for the United States presidential election of that year.

In her acceptance speech at the 2017 Screen Actors Guild Awards, she denounced President Donald Trump's executive order of travel ban as "un-American," and said, "My father fled religious persecution in Nazi-occupied France."

Louis-Dreyfus emceed the final night of the 2020 Democratic National Convention, endorsing Joe Biden. She has also published information regarding voting by mail and urged all Americans to vote.

Louis-Dreyfus endorsed Representative Karen Bass in the 2022 Los Angeles mayoral election, in various social media posts.

Filmography

Film

Television

Awards and nominations 

Julia Louis-Dreyfus has won the Primetime Emmy Award for Outstanding Lead Actress in a Comedy Series seven times: once for her role on The New Adventures of Old Christine (2006) and six consecutive awards for playing Selina Meyer on Veep (2012–17), as well as Outstanding Supporting Actress in a Comedy Series once for Seinfeld (1996). As of 2017, she holds the record for the most Primetime Emmy awards as an actor for the same role and is tied with Cloris Leachman for the most acting Primetime Emmy awards (with eight). She has also been nominated for nine Golden Globe Awards, winning one for Best Supporting Actress in a Series, Miniseries, or Television Film for her role as Elaine Benes on Seinfeld (1995). She has also been nominated for twenty-one Screen Actors Guild Awards and has won five for individual performance (nine altogether) for her work on Seinfeld (1997–98) and Veep (2014, 2017–18). In 2016, she won the Crossover Talent award at the 4th Annual American Reality Television Awards. 

In 2018 she was the twentieth recipient of the Mark Twain Prize for American Humor.

See also
 Alfred Dreyfus – A distant relative at the center of the Dreyfus Affair miscarriage of justice

References

External links

 
 
 
 
 
 Julia Louis-Dreyfus Video produced by Makers: Women Who Make America
 

1961 births
20th-century American actresses
21st-century American actresses
20th-century American comedians
21st-century American comedians
Actresses from Maryland
Actresses from New York City
American film actresses
American sketch comedians
American stage actresses
American television actresses
American voice actresses
American women comedians
Best Supporting Actress Golden Globe (television) winners
Comedians from New York City
Living people
Julia Louis-Dreyfus
Mark Twain Prize recipients
Northwestern University School of Communication alumni
Outstanding Performance by a Female Actor in a Comedy Series Screen Actors Guild Award winners
Outstanding Performance by a Lead Actress in a Comedy Series Primetime Emmy Award winners
Outstanding Performance by a Supporting Actress in a Comedy Series Primetime Emmy Award winners
People from Bethesda, Maryland
People from Manhattan
Philanthropists from New York (state)
American people of French descent
American people of Italian descent
American people of French-Jewish descent
American people of Italian-Jewish descent
American people of Russian-Jewish descent